The men's 4 × 400 metres relay at the 2019 World Athletics Championships was held at the Khalifa International Stadium in Doha, Qatar, from 5 to 6 October 2019.

Summary
Colombia set a new national record in the qualifying round.

In the final event of these championships, USA was able to cast three fresh athletes into the final, with the only holdover Wilbert London.  They led off with their bronze medalist Fred Kerley, but the early leader was Jamaica's Akeem Bloomfield, with Belgium's Jonathan Sacoor also in the mix.  Down the home stretch, Kerley pulled back ground as Bloomfield slowed, by the handoff, USA had a step on Jamaica.  Michael Cherry expanded USA's advantage over Jamaica's Nathon Allen through the turn to take 3 metres at the break.  Behind him, Colombia's Diego Palomeque also ran a strong turn to pip Belgium's Robin Vanderbemden for third place.  Through the final turn, Allen pulled in a metre on Cherry.  While losing ground to the leaders, Trinidad and Tobago's Jereem Richards brought them into a 3-way battle for bronze.  Onto the home stretch, Allen started losing ground to Cherry, sliding back toward the battle.  With five metres, Cherry handed off to London, wearing a white sweatband on his head.  In early strategy sessions, USA probably planned on their new superstar who wears a similar sweatband, Michael Norman, anchoring, but had to rearrange after Norman shut it down during his 400 semi-final.  Jamaica's Terry Thomas took off after London, gaining strongly on the backstretch to shadow London through the final turn.  Thomas set himself up to pounce coming off the turn, instead London slowly began widening the gap, getting the lead back to 4 metres before he named off to Norman's training partner, hurdler Rai Benjamin.  Behind London and Thomas, Belgium's Dylan Borlée put an early gap on Colombia's Jhon Solís and was now free by 3 metres at the handoff to his brother Kevin Borlée.  Benjamin slowly expanded his lead on Jamaica's Demish Gaye, by the finish it was 11 metres.  Another 12 metres behind Jamaica, Borlée was able to hold off Colombia's new find, silver medalist Anthony Zambrano for bronze.

USA's 2:56.69 was the fastest relay in 11 years, number 11 on the all time list.  8 of the 10 times ahead of them are also USA teams.  Colombia set a new national record again in the final, a second and a half improvement, going under 3 minutes for the first time and moving their country into #15 on the all time list.

Records
Before the competition records were as follows:

The following records were matched or set at the competition:

Schedule
The event schedule, in local time (UTC+3), was as follows:

Results

Heats
The first three in each heat (Q) and the next two fastest (q) qualified for the final.

Final
The final was started on 6 October at 21:36.

References

4 x 400 metres relay
Relays at the World Athletics Championships